Tallone is a surname. Notable people with the surname include:

 Cesare Tallone (1853–1919), Italian painter
 Filippo Tallone (1902–1962), Italian sculptor
 Guido Tallone (1894–1967), Italian painter, son of Cesare
 Gisele Tallone (1921–2007), French actress

See also
 Gallone